Kamouraska may refer to:
Kamouraska Regional County Municipality, Quebec
Kamouraska, Quebec, a municipality
Kamouraska (novel), a novel by Anne Hébert
Kamouraska (film), a film by Claude Jutra, based on the novel
Kamouraska (electoral district), a former federal electoral district in the Canadian province of Quebec
Kamouraska (provincial electoral district), a former provincial electoral district in Quebec